was an Edo period Japanese samurai, and the 4th daimyō  of Kaga Domain in the Hokuriku region of Japan. He was the 5th hereditary chieftain of the Kanazawa Maeda clan. His childhood name was "Inuchiyo" (犬千代).

Biography 
Tsunanori was born at the Maeda clan residence in Edo as the eldest son of Maeda Mitsutaka. His mother was the daughter of Tokugawa Yorifusa of Mito Domain. Mitsutaka died in 1645 at the age of 29, leaving the domain in the hands of his 3-year-old son, and by order of the Tokugawa shogunate, Tsunanori's uncle, Maeda Toshitsune was named regent. Tsunanori was called Matsudaira Inuchiyo-maru in his youth, He underwent the genpuku ceremony in 1654, with Shōgun Tokugawa Ietsuna presiding and was awarded Senior 4th Rank, lower grade and the courtesy title of  Sakonoe-shosho and Kaga-no-kami at that time. In 1658, he was wed to Suma-hime, the daughter of Hoshina Masayuki of Aizu Domain. However, this was a political marriage; she was only 10 years old, and died in 1666 at the age of 18. Tsunanori never formally remarried.

In 1658, Toshitsune died, and Tsunanori was finally able to take full control of the domain. One of his first steps was to initiate a land reform program grouping villages into groups of ten in order to facilitate tax collection and opening of new rice lands. He also established a more systematic approach to famine relief and to medical care within the domain. He revised the domain laws which had been very severe since the time of Maeda Toshiie’s suppression of the Ikkō-ikki. Tsunanori also settled a long-simmering border dispute with Fukui Domain over who “owned” the holy mountain of Hakusan on the border of the two provinces. 

Tsunanori was also a noted patron of the arts, especially favoring the performance of Noh plays in the domain. He also amassed major collection of Japanese and Chinese literary works. However, he is perhaps best known for his development of the famous Kenroku-en gardens in Kanazawa.

In 1689, under Shōgun Tokugawa Tsunayoshi, the domain was accorded the same courtesy in audiences in Edo Castle as was extended to the Gosanke, and the kokudaka of the domain was reassessed at 1 million koku. 

Tsunanori retired from public life in 1723 and died in 1724 at the age of 80.

Family
 Father: Maeda Mitsutaka
 Mother: Tokugawa Ōhime (1627-1665), daughter of Tokugawa Yorinobu of Wakayama Domain
 Wife: Matsuhime (1648-1666)
 Concubines:
 Omiyo no Kata
 Juen’in
 Chosho-in
 Hojuin
 Omachi no Kata
 Horin’in
 Okoshi no Kata
 Children:
 Maeda Toshikiyo (1674-1675) by Omiyo no Kata
 Senhime (1677-1681) by Juen’in
 Ushihime (1680-1730) married Asano Yoshinaga by Juen’in
 Reishoin (1677-1677) by Chosho-in
 Toyohime (1687-1718) married Maeda Takasuke by Hojuin
 Keihime (1689-1737) married Ikeda Yoshiyasu by Hojuin
 Maeda Toshiakira (1691 – 1737) by Hojuin
 Naohime (1693-1749) married Nijō Yoshitada by Hojuin
 Yoshihime (1689-1693) by Omachi no Kata
 Maeda Yoshinori by Omachi no Kata
 Kumaru (1689-1689) by Horin’in
 Masajuro (1698-1699) by Okoshi no Kata
 Adopted Daughters:
 Kyohime married Cho Hisatsura
 Seihime married Sanjonishi Ginfuku
 Utsuhime married Sakai tadayori

Honors
1654: Senior 4th Grade, lower rank and Sakonoe-shosho
1658: Sakonoe-chusho
1693: Sangi
1707: Senior Third Grade
1723: Hizen-no-kami
1909: Second Grade (posthumous)

References 
Papinot, Edmond. (1948). Historical and Geographical Dictionary of Japan. New York: Overbeck Co.
『江戸三百藩藩主列伝』 新人物往来社〈別冊歴史読本〉、2012年

External links
Kaga Domain on "Edo 300 HTML" (3 November 2007) 

1643 births
1724 deaths
Maeda clan
Tozama daimyo
People of Edo-period Japan